Gehad El-Haddad (born c.1981) is an Egyptian political activist for the Muslim Brotherhood in Egypt. He acted as media spokesman for the Brotherhood from May 2013 until he was arrested on 17 September 2013.

The son of Essam El-Haddad, a member of the Brotherhood's Guidance Bureau, Gehad El-Haddad grew up in Alexandria. He worked for the Industrial Modernization Centre and then the Clinton Climate Initiative. Afterwards, he volunteered for the Muslim Brotherhood Renaissance Project (Project implementation started  while Morsi was in office). In February 2017, as some reports emerged that the Trump administration was mulling designating the Muslim Brotherhood as a foreign terrorist organisation, Gehad El-Haddad wrote an op-ed for The New York Times from his prison cell in Tora Prison in Cairo outlining that the MB was not a terrorist organisation but rather a peaceful socio-political organisation. After writing the op-Ed, he was moved to a disciplinary cell in Scorpion Prison.

On 25 October 2019, his brother Abdullah stated that Gehad had lost his ability to walk.

References

External links
 Gehad El-Haddad interview on BBC HARDtalk
 Bel Trew, Brotherhood under siege: Q & A with FJP advisor Gehad El-Haddad, Ahram Online, 1 July 2013
 Gehad El-Haddad, In Egypt, a violent step backward, The Washington Post, 9 July 2013
 Gehad El-Haddad, Twitter Account

1982 births
Year of birth uncertain
Living people
Egyptian Muslim Brotherhood members
Egyptian activists
Torture victims
El-Haddad family
Politicians from Alexandria
21st-century Egyptian politicians